Styr & ställ is a public bicycle rental program in Gothenburg, Sweden. It was launched on 10 August 2010 and is used by both tourists and citizens of Gothenburg. Anyone with a subscription can rent one of the 1,000 bikes, from one of the 60 stations located around the city.

History

2010
The system was launched on 10 August and consisted of 600 bikes and 50 stations. The price for a season ticket was 100 kronor (€11.41 as of October 2013), and 10 kronor for a three-day subscription.

2011 
The season lasted from 1 April to 31 October and the number of bikes increased to 700. The price for a season ticket was 250 kronor. From 1 April to 30 June, 1,087 people started a season subscription and 6,960 three-day cards were sold.

2012 
Over the year, there were over 202,000 leases and 18,000 subscribers, and the number of leases since the launch in 2010 passed 500,000.

2013 
The season has been extended and reaches from 1 March to 30 November. The price for a season subscription has been reduced to 125 kronor, the number of bikes has increased to 1,000 and the number of stations to 60.

2014 
In 2014, the season has been extended from 1 March to 31  December. The price for a season subscription has been further  reduced to 75 kronor, while the number of bikes and stations remains constant.

Usage statistics

External links 
 
 Official website

Sources

Notes

Public transport in Sweden
Community bicycle programs
Bicycle sharing in Sweden